The spotfin surfperch (Hyperprosopon anale) is a species of ray-finned fish from the surfperch family Embiotocidae.

References

Spotfin surfperch
Fish described in 1861